Andréa Tommasi is a geoscientist from Brazil known for her research on geodynamics and terrestrial deformation. She is a recipient of the CNRS silver medal and an elected fellow of the American Geophysical Union.

Education and career 
Tommasi earned her Ph.D. from the University of Montpellier in 1995. Following her Ph.D., she was a postdoc at the University of Leeds from 1997 until 1998. In 1998 she joined the faculty of the French National Centre for Scientific Research (CNRS). As of 2020, Tommasi is the research director of the Geosciences Laboratory at the University of Montpellier.

In 2016, Tommasi was elected a fellow of the American Geophysical Union who cited her "for pioneering work on deformation mechanisms and microstructures within the Earth and their impact on plate tectonics".

Research 
Tommasi's early research was on deformation of rocks in the Dom Feliciano Belt in Brazil. Her research includes the development of numerical models to study seismic anisotropy and continental rifting. Tommasi's research extends to locations around the globe including Siberia, the Avacha volcano in Kamchatka, Hawaii, and the Southwest Indian Ridge.

Selected publications

Awards and honors 
 Fellow, American Geophysical Union (2016)
 CNRS 2020 silver medal (2020)

References

External links 
 

Fellows of the American Geophysical Union
Living people
French National Centre for Scientific Research scientists
University of Montpellier alumni
Academic staff of the University of Montpellier
Women geologists
Year of birth missing (living people)